The Lille Stesichorus is a papyrus containing a major fragment of poetry usually attributed to the archaic lyric poet Stesichorus, discovered at Lille University and published in 1976. It has been considered the most important of all the Stesichorus fragments, confirming his role as an historic link between genres as different as the epic poetry of Homer and the lyric poetry of Pindar. The subject matter and style are typical of his work generally but not all scholars have accepted it as his work. The fragment is a narrative treatment of a popular myth, involving the family of Oedipus and the tragic history of Thebes, and thus it sheds light on other treatments of the same myth, such as by Sophocles in Oedipus Tyrannos and Aeschylus in Seven Against Thebes. The fragment is significant also in the history of colometry since it includes lyric verses that have been divided into metrical cola, a practice usually associated with the later career of Aristophanes of Byzantium.

Discovery
At the turn of the twentieth century, a mummy case and its contents were deposited at the Lille University by Pierre Jouguet, the founder of the university's Institute of Egyptology, and Gustave Lefebvre. The papyrus packing material inside the case was covered with ancient Greek script, including fragments of previously unknown poetry, a discovery that was made much later and which was published in 1976 by Ancher and Meillier (see References below). However they assembled the fragments for publication in the wrong order, basing it purely on considerations of papyrus texture, alignment of lines and length of columns. The correct order for the text was instead worked out by P. J. Parsons and published the following year (see References).

The assembled fragments comprised one hundred and twenty-five consecutive lines, of which thirty-three were virtually intact, representing a portion of a much larger poem (calculated to have been about seven hundred lines). The verses were structured in triadic stanzas (strophe, antistrophe, epode), typical of choral lyric. Triads are found for example in plays by Aeschylus, Sophocles and Euripides, in odes by Pindar and Bacchylides, and they are known also to have been characteristic of the poetry of Stesichorus. The handwriting indicated that a scribe had written it as early as 250 BC but the poetic style indicated that the original composition must have been much earlier .

There was no record of title or author but the Doric dialect, the meter and overall style suggested that it was probably a work of Stesichorus, sometime in the first half of the 6th century BC. His authorship however was promptly questioned by Bollack et al. (see References) and Parsons also was sceptical, noting the Homeric cliches and "drab, repetitious flaccidity" of the verse. Martin Litchfield West then presented the case in favour of Stesichorus, even turning Parson's arguments on their head and winning over Parsons himself, since ancient commentators had noted the same characteristics that Parsons had found fault with: Stesichorus could be long-winded and flaccid (redundat et effunditur, Quintilian 10.1.62) and "most Homeric" (Longinus 13.3). However, West was careful not to endorse Parson's low opinion of the fragment's artistic quality.

Significance
The fragment's importance may be understood in terms of the tenuous state of Stesichorean scholarship prior to the discovery. In 1841, the philologist Theodor Bergk could publish only fifty-three small fragments attributed to Stesichorus, the longest only six lines. The situation was hardly different by the time Denys Page published Poetae Melici Graeci in 1962. Five years later it was still possible to comment: "Time has dealt more harshly with Stesichorus than with any other major lyric poet ... no passage longer than six lines is quoted from him, and papyrus finds have been meagre. For an estimate of his poetry we depend almost wholly on hearsay [from ancient commentators]." That same year, 1967, Edgar Lobel published the papyrus remnants of another three poems, which were later included in Page's Supplementum Lyricis Graecis in 1974, the longest however just twelve lines. Thus the sudden appearance of the Lille Stesichorus in 1976, with over one hundred and twenty consecutive lines, thirty-three virtually intact, was a cause of considerable excitement in scholarly circles.

The contents of the fragment seem not to fit any of the titles attested for Stesichorus, though the first book of Eripyle has been suggested. The context of the original poem is clearly the Theban myth of the ill-fated Labdakid clan. The first one hundred and seventy-five lines are missing but they probably dealt summarily with the demise of Oedipus, the quarrel between his sons Eteocles and Polynices, and the intervention of the seer Tiresias. The best preserved section (lines 201–34) is a speech by the Theban queen, who isn't named but who is probably Jocasta, sometimes known as Epicaste, the mother and wife of Oedipus and thus the grandmother/mother of Eteocles and Polynices (she is probably not Eurygania who, in some versions of the Oedipus myth, is his second wife and the mother of his children, yet the fragment doesn't allow for certainty on this issue).

The artistic merit of the verses has been questioned by Parsons, for example, but it also has admirers. Jocasta may be thought to emerge from her speech as a strong woman who seeks practical solutions to the plight of her sons even while feeling distress and anxiety for them:

The fragment indicates that Stesichorus might have been the first author to interpret the fate of the Labdacid clan in a wider political context. It also indicates that he portrayed characters from a psychological perspective, revealing them through their own words, in a manner not achieved in epic. Thus the repetitions that some critics have regarded as a weakness can have a dramatic effect, revealing for example the intensity of Jocasta's grief and her deep concern for her children.

The fragment aids not just our understanding of Stesichorus but also our understanding of other authors who treated the same myth, such as Aeschylus in Seven Against Thebes, Sophocles in Oedipus Rex and Euripides in The Phoenician Women, and this in turn reflects back on the fragment. The Phoenician Women for example includes a scene that bears a strong resemblance to the best preserved part of the fragment, in which Jocasta tries to mediate between her feuding sons, and the dramatist may have modelled it on the poem (Euripides's readiness to model his plays on Stesichorean versions of traditional myth is shown also in his play Helen, adapted from a Stesichorus poem of the same name) Euripides' Jocasta commits suicide after witnessing the deaths of her sons and maybe Stesichorus' poem ended the same way. There is as well a strong resemblance between the Stesichorean Jocasta and the queen in Oedipus Rex, in her dramatic plight, her rhetoric, her dismissal of oracles and her doomed attempt to subvert Fate, so that her dramatic role might even be regarded as the unique creation of Stesichorus rather than Sophocles. It has been argued that the Stesichorean Jocasta might speak her lines in response to a prophetic dream, like Clytemnestra in another one of Stesichorus's poems. The dream motif was borrowed by Aeschylus for his own version of the Clytemnestra character in Libation Bearers.

The fragment also has implications for our understanding of ancient scholarship, especially the manner in which poetic texts were transmitted. It was usual in ancient times for uniform verses to be written out in lines, as for example lines of dactylic hexameter in epic verse and iambic trimeter in drama, but lyric verses, which feature varying metrical units or cola, were written out like prose. Aristophanes of Byzantium is known to have converted such lyrical "prose" into lines of verse, varying in length and meter according to cola, and it is to his efforts for example that we owe the manuscript tradition for Pindar. It has been assumed that he was an innovator in this practice of colometry but the Lille Stesichorus is the work of an earlier scribe and the lyrics are written in lines according to cola, not in the manner of prose (See Turner 1987 in the References).

The Queen's Speech
The best preserved part of the fragment mainly comprises the queen's speech (lines 204–31). The context is not entirely clear. For example, the fate of Oedipus is unknown, though her arrangements for his property imply that he is dead. Her mention of a family curse suggests that her two sons are born from an incestuous marriage and that she therefore is Jocasta/Epicaste. She speaks in response to a prophecy that her sons are to kill each other in a feud and her attempts to resolve the issue point forward to the well-known scenario covered by Aeschylus in the Seven Against Thebes, where one son returns from exile with an army to claim the throne. Thus, ironically, her dismissal of Fate and her attempts to dodge it only help seal their doom, and there is a suggestion of tragic self-delusion. She begins by addressing Apollo, or possibly his interpreter, Tiresias, in a gnomic style, typically a Homeric approach, and then addresses her sons. The meter is dactylo-epitrite, a lyrical variation on the dactylic hexameter used by Homer (some of the lines are in fact quasi dactylic hexameter).

The Greek text is Haslam's (see References), reproduced by Segal and Campbell. The square brackets indicate gaps in the papyrus and enclose conjectured words, while brackets < > enclose letters omitted by the scribe. The translation mimics the quantitative verse of the original by retaining a given number of syllables per line rather than just by substituting accentual rhythm for quantitative rhythm.

Notes

Citations

References
Adrados, F. R. (1978), "Propuestas para una nueva edición e interpretación de Estesícoro", Emerita 46: 251–99
Ancher, G. and Meillier, C. (1976), Cahier de Recherches de l'Institut de Papyrologie et d'Egyptologie de Lille, 4: 279–337, 346–351
Andreas, Willi (2008), Sikelismos: Sprache, Literatur und Gesellschaft im griechischen Sizilen, Schwabe Verlag,  [see Susana Mimbrera Olarte's review, Bryn Mawr Classical Review (23 Dec. 2008, online here)]
Bollack, J., Judet de le Combe, P., and Wisman, H. (1977), La replique de Jocaste, Cahiers de Philologie, II, avec un supplement, Publications de l'Universite de Lille III. Lille
Bremer, J. M., van Erp Taalman, Kip A. M., and Slings, S. R. (1987), Some Recently Found Greek Poems. Text and Commentary (Mnemosyne Supplement 99), E. J. Brill. Leiden.
Burnett, Anne (1988), "Jocasta in the West: The Lille Stesichorus", Classical Antiquity Vol. 7 No.2, pp. 107–54 (online here)
Campbell, David (1967) Greek Lyric Poetry, MacMillan Education; reprinted by Bristol Classical Press, 1982
Campbell, David (1991), Greek Lyric Vol. 3, Loeb Classical Library
Haslam, M. W. (1978), 'The versification of the new Stesichorus (P. Lille 76abc)', G.R.B.S. 19: 29–57
Kovacs, David (2005) "Text and Transmission", A Companion to Greek Tragedy, Blackwell Publishing
Lowell Edmunds (2006), Oedipus: Gods and heroes of the Ancient World, Routledge
Martin, Richard P. (2005), "The Voices of Jocasta", Proceedings of International Conference on Ancient Drama, Delphi, Greece 2002 (online here)
Massimilla, G. (1990), "Un Sogno di Giocasta in Stesicoro?", P.P. 45, pp. 192–95
Parsons, P. J. (1977), "The Lille 'Stesichorus'", Zeitschrift für Papyrologie und Epigraphik 26: 7–36
Segal, Charles (1985) "Archaic choral lyric", The Cambridge History of Classical Literature': Greek Literature, Cambridge University Press
Thalmann, William G. (1982) "The Lille Stesichorus and the 'Seven Against Thebes'", Hermes 110. Bd., H. 4, pp. 385–91 (online here)
Turner, E. G., (1987), Greek Manuscripts of the Ancient World. Ed. P. J. Parsons, London
West, M. L. (1978), "Stesichorus at Lille", Z.P.E. 29: 1–4. (online here)

Lost poems
Ancient Greek poems
Papyrus
Papyrology